Lasionycta perplexa is a moth of the family Noctuidae. It is widely distributed from southern Alaska and Yukon in the north to California, Utah, and Colorado in the South. A disjunct population is found on the east coast of Hudson Bay at Kuujjuaraapik.

The habitat is conifer forest.

The wingspan is 33–35 mm. Adults are on wing from mid-June through August.

The larvae feed on Alnus species.

External links
A Revision of Lasionycta Aurivillius (Lepidoptera, Noctuidae) for North America and notes on Eurasian species, with descriptions of 17 new species, 6 new subspecies, a new genus, and two new species of Tricholita Grote
Images

Lasionycta
Moths of North America
Moths described in 1888